Monteros Department is a department in Tucumán Province, Argentina. It has a population of 58,442 and an area of 1,169 km². The seat of the department is in Monteros.

Municipalities and communes
Acheral
Amberes
Capitán Cáceres
El Cercado
Los Sosas
Monteros
Río Seco
Santa Lucía
Santa Rosa y Los Rojo
Sargento Moya
Soldado Maldonado
Teniente Berdina
Villa Quinteros

Notes
This article includes content from the Spanish Wikipedia article Departamento Monteros.

Departments of Tucumán Province